Woolley Green may refer to:

Woolley Green, Berkshire
Woolley Green, Wiltshire